Setellia femoralis is a species of fly in the genus Setellia of the family Richardiidae.

References

Tephritoidea